Grenchen Nord railway station is a railway station in the municipality of Grenchen, in the Swiss canton of Solothurn. It is an intermediate stop on the Basel–Biel/Bienne line and is served by regional and long-distance trains.

Services

Long-distance 
The following long-distance trains call at Grenchen Nord:

 InterCity: hourly service over the Basel–Biel/Bienne line from Biel/Bienne to Basel SBB.

Regional 
The following regional trains call at Grenchen Nord:

 RegioExpress: hourly service over the Basel–Biel/Bienne line from Biel/Bienne to Meroux (in France).

References

External links 
 
 

Railway stations in the canton of Solothurn
BLS railway stations